Dr. J. N. Singh Yadav (born 12 June 1937) is an Indian historian and author from Bashirpur in the Mahendragarh district of the northern Indian state of Haryana. A graduate and master of arts in political science from University, he obtained his doctorate from Kurukshetra University.
Yadav has more than a quarter of a century's experience teaching post-graduate and under-graduate classes in various colleges in Haryana. He is also involved in various social reform movements and educational institutions and as a result took voluntary retirement in order to devote more time to research and social work.

Literary works
Yadav is a prolific writer in both English and Hindi. His book Lal Bahadur Shastri: A Biography, was judged one among the best fifty biographies written during the period 1947–1972 in India and selected from several thousand titles received by the National Book Trust for display at the National Exhibition of Books at the World Book Fair in March, 1972 in New Delhi. Yadav's The Indian Speaker: Crisis of Identity was well received and appreciated by the academic world. He has also edited Haryana: Studies in History and Politics and written books for under-graduate students, such as Principles of Political Science, Indian Constitution and Administration, amongst others. Yadav has also contributed a number of research papers and articles to various journals, periodicals and seminars.

Books
 The Indian speaker: crisis of identity
 Yadavas of South India
 Yadavas Through the Ages
 Yadavas Through The Ages (2 Vol. Set)
 Yādavoṃ kā itihāsa: ādikāla se madhya yuga taka
 यादवों का बृहत् इतिहास: आरम्भिक काल से वर्तमान तक-दो खण्डों में
 Haryana: studies in history and politics
 Ābhīrī bhāshā kī dantakathāem̐
 Haihaya vaṃśa kā nūtana itihāsa: ārambhika yuga se vartamāna kāla taka

See also
 Yadavs
 Yaduvanshi Ahirs

References

20th-century Indian biographers
1937 births
Writers from Haryana
Living people
Kurukshetra University alumni
20th-century Indian historians
People from Mahendragarh district